Ambohimahasoa is a city in Madagascar, in the Haute Matsiatra region. The city lies in the southern parts of the Central Highlands, near the city of Fianarantsoa.

RN7 connects the city to Antananarivo to the north, and Fianarantsoa and Toliara to the south.

Roads
It is crossed by two national roads: the National road 7 and the National road 25.

References

Populated places in Haute Matsiatra